Latak may refer to:
 Latak, Amlash (لاتك - Lātak), Gilan Province
 Latak, Rudsar (لاتك - Lātak), Gilan Province
 Latak, Mazandaran (لتاك - Latāk)